Burnet Rhett Maybank (March 7, 1899September 1, 1954) was a three-term US senator, the 99th governor of South Carolina, and mayor of Charleston, South Carolina. He was the first governor from Charleston since the American Civil War (1861-1865) and one of only twenty people in United States history to have been elected mayor, governor, and United States senator. During his tenure in the Senate, Maybank was a powerful ally of President Franklin D. Roosevelt. His unexpected death on September 1, 1954, from a heart attack, led to Strom Thurmond being elected senator.

Early life and family
Maybank was born in Charleston, South Carolina, into one of the city's most prominent and wealthy families. He was the direct descendant of five former South Carolina governors: Thomas Smith, Rawlins Lowndes, Robert Gibbes, James Moore and William Aiken, Jr. Additionally, he was related to U.S. Senator Robert Barnwell Rhett. Maybank graduated from the Porter Military Academy (now known as Porter-Gaud) and went on to earn a degree from the College of Charleston. He served in the United States Navy during World War I.

Burnet Maybank was born to Dr. Joseph Maybank VI and Harriet Lowndes Rhett, the first of ten. He married Elizabeth deRosset Myers on June 28, 1923. They had three children: a son, Burnet, and two daughters, Elizabeth and Roberta. After the death of his first wife Maybank remarried, but the second marriage produced no children. His son, Burnet R. Maybank Jr., later held the office of lieutenant governor of South Carolina, as well as serving as a legislator in the General Assembly and as candidate for governor.

Career

Mayor of Charleston
Prior to becoming interested in politics and public service, Maybank had established himself in the cotton export business from 1920 to 1938. A lifelong Democrat, Maybank entered politics for the first time in 1927, when he was elected to a four-year term as alderman in Charleston. He rose to mayor pro tempore in 1930 and was then elected mayor of Charleston in 1931, serving until 1938. As mayor, Maybank balanced the budget during the Great Depression. He refused an increase of his own salary to $6,000 from $3,600, and reduced local taxes. Maybank took advantage of federal financing under President Franklin D. Roosevelt's administration for slum clearance, construction of public housing and other infrastructure, and support for unemployment payments. He also used a Works Progress Administration (WPA) grant to restore the historic Dock Street Theatre, and other grants went to such infrastructure improvements as the city docks and a city incinerator.

During this period Maybank was also appointed as a member of the State Board of Bank Control (1932–1933) and was chairman of the South Carolina Public Service Authority (1935–1939). It supervised a state-sponsored power project on the Santee River. This project, known as the "little TVA", was built to control floods as well as provide hydroelectric power for the state. Maybank was a conservative supporter of President Roosevelt's New Deal, which funded public works and job programs. But he opposed a share of the president's labor policies. In addition, he was appointed by the governor as a member of the South Carolina State Advisory Board of the federal Public Works Administration from 1933 to 1934.

Governor of South Carolina 
With the favorable publicity from the Santee project, a strong political base in Charleston, and support from his mentor, U.S. Senator James F. Byrnes, Maybank was elected as governor in 1938. As governor, Maybank tried unsuccessfully to create an adequate state police force, but he did supervise a vigorous prosecution of the criminal element in the state. He strictly enforced liquor and gambling statutes. Maybank personally interceded to prevent to destruction of a high wall around the historic jail in Charleston when it became threatened by a housing project expansion.

He fought the Ku Klux Klan, which had reached its peak of revival in the 1920s but was still active. Maybank expanded economic opportunities for black people in the racially segregated society and tried to improve the quality of black schools in the state, which were historically underfunded. He did nothing to alter the disfranchisement of blacks due to provisions in the state constitution and electoral laws since the turn of the twentieth century.

Senator and premature death 
In January 1941 President Roosevelt appointed Byrnes to the U.S. Supreme Court. Maybank won a special election to fill Byrnes's US Senate seat in September 1941, defeating former governor Olin D. Johnston with 56.6 percent of the vote. In 1942 Maybank was elected to the full six-year term, and in 1948 he was reelected without opposition, and served until his death in 1954.

Maybank was a powerful senator, part of the southern Democratic block. Maybank served as chairman of the Committee on Banking and Currency and as co-chairman of the Joint Committee on Defense Production. As chair of the Subcommittee on Independent Offices, under the Appropriations Committee, Maybank provided critical support to continue the U.S. nuclear weapons program in the early 1950s. He introduced the "Maybank Amendment", which was tacked onto the 1953 Defense Appropriations Bill. The amendment relieved the Department of Defense from federal legislation to target a percentage of its expenditures to high unemployment areas. Shortly before his death, Maybank was voted as one of the "20 Most Influential Americans" by Fortune magazine.

Maybank died of a heart attack at his summer home in Flat Rock, North Carolina in 1954. He was interred in Magnolia Cemetery in Charleston. Several dignitaries attended including then-Governor James F. Byrnes, Strom Thurmond, Ernest F. Hollings, thirteen United States senators, congressmen, and state and local officials. Maybank's sudden death two months before election day threw open the 1954 Senate election in South Carolina. Strom Thurmond won as a write-in candidate against the nominee chosen by Democratic party leaders to replace Maybank.

Following Maybank's death, numerous places throughout the state were named in his honor including Maybank Highway, the Burnet Maybank Bridge, and the Maybank Hall at the College of Charleston.

Legacy
Bertie Bowman, who became a hearing coordinator for the Senate Foreign Relations Committee, published his memoir, Step by Step: A Memoir of Hope, Friendship, Perseverance, and Living the American Dream, in 2009. He noted the personal support he had received from Senator Maybank. A poor black farmer's son, he went to Washington from South Carolina in 1944 as a runaway at age 14 and went to Senator Maybank. He got the youth a janitor's position, and took a personal interest in Bowman (who then had no family in Washington). Gradually the young black man advanced while working for the Senate, as he describes in his memoir. In March 2009 Senator Maybank's granddaughter, Elizabeth Parker, traveled to D.C. to meet with Bowman for the first time. A month later, more of the Maybank family met Bowman and his wife, Elaine, in Charleston.

Vice President Joe Biden mentioned Maybank at the dedication ceremony for the Ernest Hollings Special Collections Library at the University of South Carolina on July 23, 2010.  He said,

You know, an old governor of yours, Burnet Maybank, once wrote an essay entitled, "Who Is the South Carolinian?" And here's what it said. He said, there's a deal—there is a deal of kindness about him, describing the South Carolinian. He feels favored when asked for personal assistance. A neighborly spirit prompts him to render service with a scorn for remuneration.

See also

 List of United States Congress members who died in office (1950–99)

References

Sources

 Dictionary of American Biography
 Cann, Marvin. "Burnet Rhett Maybank and the New Deal in South Carolina from 1931 to 1941". PhD dissertation, University of North Carolina, 1967
 U.S. Congress. Memorial Addresses. 83rd Cong., 2nd sess., 1954. Washington, D.C.: Government Printing Office, 1955.

External links
SCIway Biography of Burnet Rhett Maybank
NGA Biography of Burnet Rhett Maybank
Burnet Maybank Senatorial Papers

1899 births
1954 deaths
United States Navy personnel of World War I
College of Charleston alumni
Democratic Party governors of South Carolina
University of South Carolina trustees
Mayors of Charleston, South Carolina
Democratic Party United States senators from South Carolina
Businesspeople from Charleston, South Carolina
Military personnel from Charleston, South Carolina
20th-century American politicians
People from Flat Rock, Henderson County, North Carolina
20th-century American businesspeople
20th-century American Episcopalians
Burials at Magnolia Cemetery (Charleston, South Carolina)